nsupdate is a computer network maintenance utility used by network administrators to instruct the name server of a DNS zone to update its database.  The name server might be local to a domain or, with appropriate authentication and permission provided by DNSSEC, an internet name server.

BIND 8 and later supports this feature.

See also
 Daemon (computer software)

External links
 
 nsupdate: Quick and Painless Dynamic DNS
 NSUPDATE HOWTO by Stef Caunter, Feb 2003. Updated Jan 28, 2005.
 Debian Administration  System Administration Tips and Resources

References
 

Internet Protocol based network software
Domain Name System